Alexander Genis (born February 11, 1953) is a Russian–American writer, broadcaster, and cultural critic. He has written more than a dozen books that are non-fiction bestsellers in Russia.

Genis, an American citizen, resides in the New York City area. He is the father of Daniel Genis, writer and journalist.

Life and career

After graduating from the Latvian State University in Riga, then in the Soviet Union, Genis immigrated to the USA in 1977 at the age of 24. His career started in New York City where he met and worked with Nobel Prize in Literature winner Joseph Brodsky, writer Sergei Dovlatov, painter and writer-conceptualist Vagrich Bakhchanyan.
  
Genis is an anchorman of the weekly radio-show American Hour with Alexander Genis broadcast in Russian by Radio Liberty since the 1990s. Genis is a columnist and a contributing writer for the main liberal Russian newspaper Novaya Gazeta, and used to be the host of the TV show Alexander Genis. Letters from America, shown on Russian TV channel "Culture".

Bibliography

Red bread (collection of essays).
USA from A to Y (cultural travelogue from the outside in).
Knit  (autobiographical essays).
Darkness and Stillness (meditations).
6 Fingers (intellectual autobiography).
Candy Wrappers( analysis of classical Russian paintings).
Ginger-man (culinary essays).
The Tower of Babel (cultural criticism).
Dovlatov and his Environs (non-fiction novel, as of 2016 it had 6 publications in Russian).
Ivan Petrovich is dead (essays on modern Russian literature).
Ticket to China (cultural criticism).
A Particular Case (essays on writers).
Portrait of the Poet:  1978–1996 : Joseph Brodsky (Essay in English and Russian).

External links
 Red Bread on Amazon
 Alexander Genis at Radio Liberty
 Alexander Genis in Novaya Gazeta
 Alexander Genis in IMDB
 Alexander Genis in Zhurnal'nyj Zal
 New York TV Interview with Alexander Genis
 Moscow TV Interview with Alexander Genis

1953 births
Living people
Russian expatriates in the United States
American male journalists
Writers from New York (state)
University of Latvia alumni